The Oklahoma state elections were held on November 4, 2008. Votes for the Presidential Primary were cast on February 5. The primary election for statewide offices was held on July 29, and the runoff primary election was held August 26.

The 2008 elections marked the first time in State history that the Republican Party won control of the Oklahoma Senate and the first time they retained control of the Oklahoma House of Representatives, thereby creating the first Republican controlled Oklahoma Legislature in State history.

President

Primary
Oklahoma voters went to the polls on February 5 (Super Tuesday) to vote in the US presidential primary election. Republicans nominated Senator John McCain, while Democrats nominated Senator Hillary Clinton.

Eleven Republicans appeared on the ballot.

There were seven candidates in the Democratic primary for President.

General election

Barack Obama faced John McCain in the 2008 Presidential Election. McCain won a majority of the votes in Oklahoma and received all seven of the state's electoral votes. Oklahoma was the only state in which McCain received a majority of the votes in every county.

U.S. Senate

Two term Republican Senator Jim Inhofe defended his seat in the 2008 election against Democratic State Senator Andrew Rice and Independent Stephen Wallace. The election was considered by most pollsters to be a "safe" Republican seat.

Other Statewide Offices

Corporation Commission
Two seats on the Oklahoma Corporation Commission were up for election in 2008.

Partial term
Democrat Jim Roth was appointed by Oklahoma Governor Brad Henry to fill the vacated seat in 2007. The winner of this election will have to be reelected in 2010.

Full term

U.S. Representatives

State Questions

State Question #735
TEXT: This measure amends the Oklahoma Constitution. It adds Section 8D to Article 10. The measure takes effect January 1, 2009. It creates an exemption from personal property tax. The exemption would be for the full amount of taxes due on all household personal property. The exemption would apply to certain injured veterans. It would also apply to those veterans’ surviving spouses.

To qualify for the exemption an injured veteran would have to meet certain requirements. First, a branch of the Armed Forces or the Oklahoma National Guard would have to have honorably discharged the veteran from active service. Second, the veteran would have to be an Oklahoma resident. Third, the veteran would have to be the head of the household. Fourth, the veteran would have to be one hundred percent permanently disabled. Fifth, the United States Department of Veterans Affairs would have to certify the disability. Sixth, the disability must have occurred through military action or accident, or resulted from a disease contracted while in active service. The Legislature could pass laws to carry out the exemption. Such laws could not change the amount of the exemption.
                                          
          FOR THE PROPOSAL - YES                 1,153,831   85.00%
          AGAINST THE PROPOSAL - NO                203,644   15.00%

State Question #741
TEXT: This measure amends the Oklahoma Constitution. It would add a new Section 22A to Article 10. This section is related to exemptions from property taxes. It would require a person or business to file an application for an exemption. No exemption could be granted prior to filing an application. The Legislature may write laws to carry out the provisions of this section.
                                            
          FOR THE PROPOSAL - YES                   908,609   68.14%
          AGAINST THE PROPOSAL - NO                424,905   31.86%

State Question #742
TEXT: This measure adds a new section to the State Constitution. It adds Section 36 to Article 2. It gives all people of this state the right to hunt, trap, fish and take game and fish. Such activities would be subject to reasonable regulation. It allows the Wildlife Conservation Commission to approve methods and procedures for hunting, trapping, fishing and taking of game and fish. It allows for taking game and fish by traditional means. It makes hunting, fishing, and trapping the preferred means to manage certain game and fish. The new law will not affect existing laws relating to property rights.
                              
          FOR THE PROPOSAL - YES                 1,082,341   80.05%
          AGAINST THE PROPOSAL - NO                269,787   19.95%

State Question #743
TEXT: This measure amends Section 3 of Article 28 of the Constitution. It requires a customer to be twenty-one and physically present to purchase wine at a winery, festival or trade show. The measure changes the law to allow certain winemakers to sell directly to retail package stores and restaurants in Oklahoma. The change applies to winemakers who produce up to ten thousand gallons of wine a year. It applies to winemakers in state and out of state. Those winemakers may not also use a licensed wholesale distributor. They must sell their wine to every retail package store and restaurant in Oklahoma that wants to buy the wine. The sales must be on the same price basis. The sales must be without discrimination. Those winemakers must use their own leased or owned vehicles to distribute their wine. They may not use common or private carriers. If any part of this measure is found to be unconstitutional, no winemaker could sell wine directly to retail package stores or restaurants in Oklahoma.
                                          
FOR THE PROPOSAL - YES                 1,064,972   78.94%
AGAINST THE PROPOSAL - NO                284,141   21.06%

Sources

Official Results on the Oklahoma State Election Board's Website

See also
Government of Oklahoma
Oklahoma House of Representatives
Oklahoma Senate
Politics of Oklahoma
Oklahoma's congressional districts

 
Oklahoma